Nowe Miasto (lit. 'New Town') is a municipal neighbourhood of the city of Szczecin, Poland,  situated on the left bank of Oder river, in Śródmieście (Centre) District. It borders Turzyn to the west, Śródmieście-Zachód, Centrum and Stare Miasto to the north, Międzyodrze-Wyspa Pucka to the east, and Pomorzany to the south. As of January 2011 it had a population of 8092.

References

Nowe Miasto